The  was a battle during the Azuchi–Momoyama period (16th century) of Japan. 
At the time of the Battle of Komaki and Nagakute, Sassa Narimasa sided with Tokugawa Ieyasu, while his former companion, Maeda Toshiie stood with Toyotomi Hideyoshi.

Narimasa and Toshiie came to blows by battling at Suemori Castle. Narimasa had laid siege to the Suemori castle 9 October with 15,000 men. Okumura Nagatomi, along with his wife Katō Tsune, had defended the castle to their fullest extent, but soon their situation became very desperate. Maeda Toshiie arrived in the middle of the night, and defeated the forces of Sassa Narimasa. 

After the defenders' victory, Maeda Toshiie has become the most powerful daimyō in the Kaga (now Ishikawa Prefecture) region of Japan. .

References

1584 in Japan
Suemori
Conflicts in 1584